Harrisburg Bureau of Police is a medium-sized city police force in South Central Pennsylvania serving the City of Harrisburg, Pennsylvania. In 2019, Harrisburg had the sixth largest police department in the Commonwealth of Pennsylvania by total law enforcement employees. Since 2003, the Bureau has achieved and maintained its annual status of an Accredited Agency under the Pennsylvania Chiefs of Police Association Accreditation Program. It is one of only 131 agencies across the state to voluntarily apply for and earn the accreditation.

History 
Records show that the first police force was loosely assembled in Harrisburg city in 1861, with an unknown number of non-uniformed "Constables" making their money from fees of those arrested. Under former Mayor John Augustus Fritchey, the Police Department was formally reorganized in 1888 with official uniforms and 26 men placed on salary. That year, police call boxes were installed (and later booths). Alvin W. Weikert was appointed Chief of Police by the Mayor in 1889; the Chief worked dayshift while the Lieutenant assumed acting control for nights. The first police station was held inside the former Masonic Hall (more commonly referred to at the time as the Exchange Building) on Walnut St & 3rd St, but moved locations many times in the next decades, finally relocating to the first floor and basement of the Old City Hall building at 423 Walnut Street after its conversion from the Technical High School in 1929. Following the completion and opening of the Vance C. McCormick Public Service Center on June 17, 1982, the Bureau of Police relocated to its current day headquarters.

Since the 1970s through today, the Bureau sometimes participates with local Universities to allow researchers to conduct research and publish articles regarding their policing methodologies.

In the mid 2000s, a substation opened at 15th & Drummond Streets in the Allison Hill neighborhood. Following a period of its disuse, it was reconstructed from a modular building in 2018 at a cost of $1 million (funded primarily through grants). However, due to the COVID-19 pandemic, the Allison Hill Police Substation was not reopened to the public until July 2020.

In 2021, the Bureau's officers were overwhelmingly white despite patrolling a majority minority city, and in an ongoing problem it struggled to recruit minority officers in what was called a "perception problem" with the occupation.

Vehicles 

In the past, HBP operated an all Chevrolet fleet. The fleet consisted of Chevrolet Caprice PPV sedans and Chevrolet Tahoe PPV SUV used for K-9 patrols. In 2016, HBP revealed new Ford patrol vehicles as well as a new paint scheme, ditching the dark blue with yellow lettering for a more traditional black and white cars. Originally, the new scheme was only on new vehicles being introduced, while older Chevy units retained the old colors (until entirely withdrawn from service three months later). Currently, the department utilizes a mix of Ford Police Interceptor Utility, Ford Police Interceptor Sedan, Chevrolet Tahoe PPV, and Ford Transit Prisoner Transport vehicles moving now to an all-black color scheme.

Agency structure and Divisions

Agency structure 
The Bureau is organized under the Harrisburg Department of Public Safety, along with the Bureau of Fire, Bureau of Codes, Office of Health, and Office of Parking Enforcement. The current Police Commissioner is Thomas Carter. The current Deputy Chief of Police is Dennis Sorensen. Historically, 3 Captains lead the Uniformed Patrol, Technical Services, and Criminal Investigation Divisions. In 2020, the force was reorganized to include a Community Services Division to house the community needs more cohesively outside of the Uniformed Patrol Division.

Divisions 
 Uniformed Patrol Division
 Technical Services Division
 Community Services Division
 Criminal Investigation Division

Rank structure

Fallen officers 

See also 

 List of law enforcement agencies in Pennsylvania
 Pennsylvania Capitol Police
 Harrisburg Bureau of Fire

References 

Harrisburg, Pennsylvania
Government agencies established in 1888
Municipal police departments of Pennsylvania